Conjoint analysis is a survey-based statistical technique used in market research that helps determine how people value different attributes (feature, function, benefits) that make up an individual product or service.

The objective of conjoint analysis is to determine what combination of a limited number of attributes is most influential on respondent choice or decision making. A controlled set of potential products or services is shown to survey respondents and by analyzing how they make choices among these products, the implicit valuation of the individual elements making up the product or service can be determined. These implicit valuations (utilities or part-worths) can be used to create market models that estimate market share, revenue and even profitability of new designs.

Conjoint analysis originated in mathematical psychology and was developed by marketing professor Paul E. Green at the Wharton School of the University of Pennsylvania. Other prominent conjoint analysis pioneers include professor V. "Seenu" Srinivasan of Stanford University who developed a linear programming (LINMAP) procedure for rank ordered data as well as a self-explicated approach, and Jordan Louviere (University of Iowa) who invented and developed choice-based approaches to conjoint analysis and related techniques such as best–worst scaling.

Today it is used in many of the social sciences and applied sciences including marketing, product management, and operations research. It is used frequently in testing customer acceptance of new product designs, in assessing the appeal of advertisements and in service design. It has been used in product positioning, but there are some who raise problems with this application of conjoint analysis.

Conjoint analysis techniques may also be referred to as multiattribute compositional modelling, discrete choice modelling, or stated preference research, and are part of a broader set of trade-off analysis tools used for systematic analysis of decisions. These tools include Brand-Price Trade-Off, Simalto, and mathematical approaches such as AHP, PAPRIKA, evolutionary algorithms or rule-developing experimentation.

Conjoint design 
A product or service area is described in terms of a number of attributes. For example, a television may have attributes of screen size, screen format, brand, price and so on. Each attribute can then be broken down into a number of levels. For instance, levels for screen format may be LED, LCD, or Plasma.

Respondents are shown a set of products, prototypes, mock-ups, or pictures created from a combination of levels from all or some of the constituent attributes and asked to choose from, rank or rate the products they are shown. Each example is similar enough that consumers will see them as close substitutes but dissimilar enough that respondents can clearly determine a preference. Each example is composed of a unique combination of product features. The data may consist of individual ratings, rank orders, or choices among alternative combinations.

Conjoint design involves four different steps:
 Determine the type of study
 Identify the relevant attributes
 Specify the attributes’ levels
 Design questionnaire

1. Determine the type of study 
There are different types of studies that may be designed:
 Ranking-based conjoint
 Rating-based conjoint
 Choice-based conjoint

2. Identify the relevant attributes 
Attributes in conjoint analysis should:
 be relevant to managerial decision-making,
 have varying levels in real life,
 be expected to influence preferences,
 be clearly defined and communicable,
 preferably not exhibit strong correlations (price and brand are an exception),
 consist of at least two levels.

3. Specify the attributes’ levels 
Levels of attributes should be:
 unambiguous,
 mutually exclusive,
 realistic.

4. Design questionnaire 
As the number of combinations of attributes and levels increases the number of potential profiles increases exponentially. Consequently, fractional factorial design is commonly used to reduce the number of profiles to be evaluated, while ensuring enough data are available for statistical analysis, resulting in a carefully controlled set of "profiles" for the respondent to consider.

Earliest form and drawbacks 
The earliest forms of conjoint analysis starting in the 1970s were what are known as Full Profile studies, in which a small set of attributes (typically 4 to 5) were used to create profiles that were shown to respondents, often on individual cards. Respondents then ranked or rated these profiles. Using relatively simple dummy variable regression analysis the implicit utilities for the levels could be calculated that best reproduced the ranks or ratings as specified by respondents. Two drawbacks were seen in these early designs.

Firstly, the number of attributes in use was heavily restricted. With large numbers of attributes, the consideration task for respondents becomes too large and even with fractional factorial designs the number of profiles for evaluation can increase rapidly. In order to use more attributes (up to 30), hybrid conjoint techniques were developed that combined self-explication (rating or ranking of levels and attributes) followed by conjoint tasks.  Both paper-based and adaptive computer-aided questionnaires became options starting in the 1980s.

The second drawback was that ratings or rankings of profiles were unrealistic and did not link directly to behavioural theory. In real-life situations, buyers choose among alternatives rather than ranking or rating them. Jordan Louviere pioneered an approach that used only a choice task which became the basis of choice-based conjoint analysis and discrete choice analysis. This stated preference research is linked to econometric modeling and can be linked to revealed preference where choice models are calibrated on the basis of real rather than survey data. Originally, choice-based conjoint analysis was unable to provide individual-level utilities and researchers developed aggregated models to represent the market's preferences. This made it unsuitable for market segmentation studies. With newer hierarchical Bayesian analysis techniques, individual-level utilities may be estimated that provide greater insights into the heterogeneous preferences across individuals and market segments.

Information collection 
Data for conjoint analysis are most commonly gathered through a market research survey, although conjoint analysis can also be applied to a carefully designed configurator or data from an appropriately designed test market experiment. Market research rules of thumb apply with regard to statistical sample size and accuracy when designing conjoint analysis interviews.

The length of the conjoint questionnaire depends on the number of attributes to be assessed and the selected conjoint analysis method. A typical adaptive conjoint questionnaire with 20–25 attributes may take more than 30 minutes to complete. Choice based conjoint, by using a smaller profile set distributed across the sample as a whole, may be completed in less than 15 minutes. Choice exercises may be displayed as a store front type layout or in some other simulated shopping environment.

Analysis

Because conjoint designs are complicated, they usually generate substantial measurement error (as indicated by low intra-respondent reliability), which can induce substantial bias in any direction by any amount; this bias must be corrected in statistical analyses of conjoint data.  Depending on the type of model, different econometric and statistical methods can be used to estimate utility functions. These utility functions indicate the perceived value of the feature and how sensitive consumer perceptions and preferences are to changes in product features. The actual estimation procedure will depend on the design of the task and profiles for respondents and the measurement scale used to indicate preferences (interval-scaled, ranking, or discrete choice). For estimating the utilities for each attribute level using ratings-based full profile tasks, linear regression may be appropriate, for choice based tasks, maximum likelihood estimation usually with logistic regression is typically used. The original utility estimation methods were monotonic analysis of variance or linear programming techniques, but contemporary marketing research practice has shifted towards choice-based models using multinomial logit, mixed versions of this model, and other refinements. Bayesian estimators are also very popular. Hierarchical Bayesian procedures are nowadays relatively popular as well.

Advantages and disadvantages

Advantages
 estimates psychological tradeoffs that consumers make when evaluating several attributes together
 can measure preferences at the individual level
 uncovers real or hidden drivers which may not be apparent to respondents themselves
 mimics realistic choice or shopping task
 able to use physical objects
 if appropriately designed, can model interactions between attributes
 may be used to develop needs-based segmentation, when applying models that recognize respondent heterogeneity of tastes

Disadvantages
 designing conjoint studies can be complex
 when facing too many product features and product profiles, respondents often resort to simplification strategies
 difficult to use for product positioning research because there is no procedure for converting perceptions about actual features to perceptions about a reduced set of underlying features
 respondents are unable to articulate attitudes toward new categories, or may feel forced to think about issues they would otherwise not give much thought to
 poorly designed studies may over-value emotionally-laden product features and undervalue concrete features
 does not take into account the quantity of products purchased per respondent, but weighting respondents by their self-reported purchase volume or extensions such as volumetric conjoint analysis may remedy this

Practical applications

Market research

One practical application of conjoint analysis in business analysis is given by the following example: A real estate developer is interested in building a high rise apartment complex near an urban Ivy League university. To ensure the success of the project, a market research firm is hired to conduct focus groups with current students. Students are segmented by academic year (freshman, upper classmen, graduate studies) and amount of financial aid received. Study participants are shown a series of choice scenarios, involving different apartment living options specified on 6 attributes (proximity to campus, cost, telecommunication packages, laundry options, floor plans, and security features offered). The estimated cost to construct the building associated with each apartment option is equivalent. Participants are asked to choose their preferred apartment option within each choice scenario. This forced choice exercise reveals the participants' priorities and preferences. Multinomial logistic regression may be used to estimate the utility scores for each attribute level of the 6 attributes involved in the conjoint experiment.  Using these utility scores, market preference for any combination of the attribute levels describing potential apartment living options may be predicted.

Litigation

Federal courts in the United States have allowed expert witnesses to use conjoint analysis to support their opinions on the damages that an infringer of a patent should pay to compensate the patent holder for violating its rights. Nonetheless, legal scholars have noted that the Federal Circuit's jurisprudence on the use of conjoint analysis in patent-damages calculations remains in a formative stage.

One example of this is how Apple used a conjoint analysis to prove the damages suffered by Samsung's copyright infringement, and increase their compensation in the case.

See also
 Advertising
 Discrete choice (choice modelling)
 Marketing
 Marketing research
 New product development
 Quantitative marketing research
 TURF analysis
 Value-based pricing

References

External links
 Green, P. and Srinivasan, V. (1978) Conjoint analysis in consumer research: Issues and outlook, Journal of Consumer Research, vol 5, September 1978, pp 103–123. 
 Green, P. Carroll, J. and Goldberg, S. (1981) A general approach to product design optimization via conjoint analysis, Journal of Marketing, vol 43, summer 1981, pp 17–35.
 Srinivasan, V. (1988) A Conjunctive-Compensatory Approach to the Self-Explication of Multiattributed Preferences, Decision Sciences, Vol. 19, Spring 1998, 295–305.
 Green, P. E. and Srinivasan V. (1990) Conjoint Analysis in Marketing: New Developments with Implications for Research and Practice, Journal of Marketing, Vol. 54, October 1990, 3–19.
 Marder, E. (1999) The Assumptions of Choice Modeling
 Conjoint Analysis, Related Modeling and Applications

Market research
Product management
Psychometrics
Regression analysis